Philogyny is fondness, love, or admiration towards women. Its antonym is misogyny. Philogyny is not to be confused with gynephilia, which is sexual attraction to women or femininity. 

One of the earliest examples of philogyny is the poet Sappho who was an Archaic Greek poet from the island of Lesbos. Sappho is known for her lyric poetry, written to be sung while accompanied by a lyre. In ancient times, Sappho was widely regarded as one of the greatest lyric poets and was given names such as the "Tenth Muse" and "The Poetess". Sappho was a prolific poet, probably composing around 10,000 lines. Her poetry was well-known and greatly admired through much of antiquity, and she was among the canon of Nine Lyric Poets most highly esteemed by scholars of Hellenistic Alexandria. Sappho's poetry is still considered extraordinary and her works continue to influence other writers. Beyond her poetry, she is well known as a symbol of love and desire between women, with the English words sapphic and lesbian being derived from her own name and the name of her home island respectively. Whilst her importance as a poet is confirmed from the earliest times, all interpretations of her work have been coloured and influenced by discussions of her sexuality. Most of Sappho's poetry is now lost, and what is extant has mostly survived in fragmentary form; two notable exceptions are the "Ode to Aphrodite" and the Tithonus poem.

Hypatia (born c. 350–370; died 415 AD) was a Hellenistic Neoplatonist philosopher, astronomer, and mathematician, who lived in Alexandria, Egypt, then part of the Eastern Roman Empire. She was a prominent thinker of the Neoplatonic school in Alexandria where she taught philosophy and astronomy. Although preceded by Pandrosion, another Alexandrine female mathematician, she is the first female mathematician whose life is reasonably well recorded. Hypatia was renowned in her own lifetime as a great teacher and a wise counselor. During the Middle Ages, Hypatia was co-opted as a symbol of Christian virtue and scholars believe she was part of the basis for the legend of Saint Catherine of Alexandria. During the Age of Enlightenment, she became a symbol of opposition to Catholicism. In the nineteenth century, European literature, especially Charles Kingsley's 1853 novel Hypatia, romanticized her as "the last of the Hellenes". In the twentieth century, Hypatia became seen as an icon for women's rights and a precursor to the feminist movement.

Cicero reports the word could be used in Greek philosophy to denote being overly fond of women, which was considered a disease along with misogyny.

Christian Groes-Green has argued that the conceptual content of philogyny must be developed as an alternative to the concept of misogyny. Criticizing R.W. Connell's theory of hegemonic masculinities he shows how philogynous masculinities play out among youth in Maputo, Mozambique.

Etymology 
Philogyny comes from philo- (loving) and Greek gynē (woman). The parallel Greek-based terms with respect to men (males) are philandry for "fondness towards men" and misandry for "hatred of men". Parallel terms for humanity generally are philanthropy and misanthropy.

See also 
 Androphilia and gynephilia
 Gynocentrism
 Gynophobia

References 

Women in society
Love